Crosshouse railway station was a railway station serving the village of Knockentiber and nearby Crosshouse, East Ayrshire, Scotland. The station was originally part of the Glasgow, Paisley, Kilmarnock and Ayr Railway.

History
The station opened on 4 April 1843 as Busby. Busby station had a short life and closed on 15 April 1850, however the station reopened as Crosshouse (then as part of the Glasgow and South Western Railway) on 1 September 1872.

Crosshouse and its four platforms served as a junction station, allowing travel to Kilmarnock from the directions of both Irvine and Dalry. The Irvine service was withdrawn on 6 April 1964, with the station closing permanently to passengers on 18 April 1966, although the line was still in use by freight trains and diverted passenger trains until 23 October 1973.

See also
 Busby railway station

References

Notes

Sources 
Butt, R. V. J. (1995). The Directory of Railway Stations. Patrick Stephens Ltd, Sparkford. .
Stansfield, G. (1999). Ayrshire & Renfrewshire's Lost Railways, Stenlake Publishing, Catrine. .

Disused railway stations in East Ayrshire
Railway stations in Great Britain opened in 1843
Railway stations in Great Britain closed in 1850
Railway stations in Great Britain opened in 1872
Railway stations in Great Britain closed in 1966
Beeching closures in Scotland
1843 establishments in Scotland